Borbon or Borbón may refer to:

Borbon, Cebu, a municipality in the Philippines
Pebble Island, Falklands, known as "Isla Borbón" in Spanish
Juan Carlos I of Spain, the former King of Spain from 1975 to 2014 (Juan Carlos Alfonso Víctor María de Borbón)
Fortunato Borbon, former Governor of Batangas province in the Philippines
Pedro Borbón, a former Major League Baseball pitcher
Pedro Borbón, Jr., son of Pedro Borbón, also a former Major League Baseball pitcher
Julio Borbon, a current Major League Baseball outfielder

See also
Bourbon (disambiguation)